The Distinguished Citizen is a 2016 Argentine-Spanish comedy-drama film directed by Gastón Duprat & Mariano Cohn. It was selected to compete for the Golden Lion at the 73rd Venice International Film Festival. At Venice Oscar Martínez won the Volpi Cup for Best Actor. It was selected as the Argentine entry for the Best Foreign Language Film at the 89th Academy Awards but it was not nominated. It won Best Ibero-American Film at the 4th Platino Awards.

Plot
A recipient of the Nobel Prize for Literature, who has been living in Europe for decades, accepts an invitation from his hometown in Argentina to receive a prize. In his country, the protagonist finds both similarities and irreconcilable differences with the people of his hometown.

Cast
 Oscar Martínez as Daniel Mantovani
 Dady Brieva as Antonio
 Andrea Frigerio as Irene
 Belén Chavanne as Julia

Production 
The Distinguished Citizen came together over five years and had a US$1.7 million budget. Screenwriter Andres Duprat proposed the story based on his experiences as an art curator jurying work in small towns. Martinez was an early consideration for the lead and collaborated on the script. He called the fictional town of Salas an uncomfortable mirror of Argentina, and Montovani's exile in Spain reminiscent of Jorge Luis Borges's time spent in Europe.

Shooting took place over eight weeks, primarily in Navarro, which stood in for Salas. The directors selected it after considering 58 municipalities, citing the town's historic center, scarce traffic, lagoon, club, town square, and small television channel. Other locations included Lobos for the flat tire scene, the El Trébol club in Villa Urquiza for the author's lectures, and the Teatro Opera in Buenos Aires for the Nobel awards sequence.

A book of the same title purportedly written by the film character Mantovani describing his visit to his hometown was published in Argentina ahead of the film. The directors described the actual but anonymous author as a "heavyweight of the literary world".

Reception

Critical reception
On review aggregator website Rotten Tomatoes, the film holds an approval rating of 100%, based on 13 reviews, and an average rating of 7.2/10.

Accolades

See also
 List of submissions to the 89th Academy Awards for Best Foreign Language Film
 List of Argentine submissions for the Academy Award for Best Foreign Language Film

References

External links
 
 

2016 films
2016 drama films
2010s Spanish-language films
Argentine drama films
Spanish drama films
Films about fictional Nobel laureates
Films directed by Gastón Duprat and Mariano Cohn
2010s Argentine films